Taekwondo at the 2009 Southeast Asian Games were held in the Booyong Gymnasium National University Center, Vientiane, Laos

Medal summary

Men

Women

Poomsae

Individual Men

Mixed Pair

Team Men

External links
Southeast Asian Games Official Results

2009 Southeast Asian Games events
Southeast Asian Games
2009